Erlingur Birgir Richardsson (born 19 September 1972) is an Icelandic former handball player and currently coach for Dutch national team.

He led the team at the 2020 European Men's Handball Championship in Norway, placing 17th.

He previously coached Iceland men's national handball team and Füchse Berlin, were he won the 2016 IHF Super Globe.

In April 2020, he extended his contract with the Netherlands men's national handball team, to the summer 2022.

References

Living people
Icelandic handball coaches
1972 births
People from Vestmannaeyjar
Handball coaches of international teams
Icelandic expatriate sportspeople in Austria
Icelandic expatriate sportspeople in Germany
Icelandic expatriate sportspeople in the Netherlands
ÍBV women's handball coaches